Isaac Maria dos Anjos was the Angolan minister for agriculture and rural development in the 1994 government of Jose Eduardo dos Santos.

References

External links
https://kwachaunitapress.com/en/2017/06/13/isaac-maria-dos-anjos-released-on-the-limit-of-mandate
https://www.voaportugues.com/a/isaac-anjos-secretario-presidente-republica-sector-produtivo/4063075.html

Living people
Year of birth missing (living people)
20th-century Angolan politicians
Place of birth missing (living people)